Lamboley is a French surname that may refer to
 Grégory Lamboley (born 1982), French rugby union footballer
Jean-Jacques Lamboley (1920–1999), French motor-paced cyclist 
Paul E. Lamboley, radioman at South Pole Station
Lamboley Peak in Antarctica named after Paul
Soline Lamboley (born 1996), French cyclist, granddaughter of Jean-Jacques 

French-language surnames